The North Coast Railroad  operated freight trains on the Northwestern Pacific Railroad from Schellville (interchange with the California Northern) to Eureka. Using former Southern Pacific Railroad EMD GP9s and EMD GP7s, they powered freight along the northern and southern end of the line until 1994 when the southern portion from Schellville to Willits of the line was leased to the California Northern Railroad, which operated over the line until 1996 when the southern end began operations as the "new" publicly owned Northwestern Pacific. 

The North Coast Railroad continued operations between Willits and Eureka on the former Eureka Southern route until 1993, when the line was shut down due to rail wash-outs and two expensive tunnel collapses.

References 

Defunct California railroads
Railway companies established in 1992
Railway companies disestablished in 1996